is an action role-playing video game series developed by Noise and published by Nintendo.

The series currently spans five games, and has titles on the Nintendo 64, Game Boy Advance, GameCube, and Nintendo DS. Only the two most recent titles have seen a release outside of Japan. The most recent title in the series was first released in Japan on October 19, 2006, later seeing international release in 2007.

International release
Beginning in 1999, the Custom Robo series has largely been exclusive to Japan. In 2001, however, Nintendo released Super Smash Bros. Melee, a fighting game containing characters from throughout the company's history, worldwide. In the title's trophy room, three custom robos from Custom Robo V2 appeared as trophies: Ray Mk II, Bayonette, and Annie.

Stated by several issues of Nintendo Power, an international release of Custom Robo GX, the third title in the series, was planned but later canceled. The fourth title in the series, Custom Robo: Battle Revolution, would later be released in 2004, the first title in the series to receive and release outside of Japan. The fifth title of the series, Custom Robo Arena, would become the first and only Custom Robo title released globally.

Gameplay
Custom Robo takes place in a collect-customize-and-battle style role-playing video game genre similar to games such as Robotrek or Front Mission, but with frantic action battles in confined 3D arenas (2D arenas in Custom Robo GX), similar to Virtual On. In each game's story mode, players slip into the role of a nameable protagonist just beginning to learn about Custom Robo. In each game, the first Robo players obtain is always the latest model of the Ray series. The goal for players is to improve their skills and collect different Custom Robos in order to defeat everyone, including champion Custom Robo users.

The main objective of the game is to finish the storyline by collecting every Custom Robo and battle part, while winning every battle that moves players along through the story arc.  In Custom Robo battles, the object is to reduce the opponent's hit points from 1000 to 0 by using different Robos, guns, bombs, pods, and dash attacks. Custom Robos are arranged in groups that are similar to their abilities. The endurance bar is located above the player's hitbox; once it runs out, the Custom Robo gets "downed" which means that it stays fallen for a couple seconds. After the Robo gets up, it goes into "rebirth" mode, a temporary state of invincibility lasting 3 seconds. Should the player repeatedly lose the same battle, the game will offer the option of reducing the opponent's initial health, in order to make the battle easier. If players continue to lose several times, the degree of handicap offered increases up to 75%, giving the opponent a starting HP of 250, rather than 1000.

Games
The following is a list of games released in the series:

Games predating Battle Revolution were released only in Japan (except the first one, which was also released in China for the iQue Player). Due to this, there are no official titles for North American or European releases of these games. Such a title may be given if Nintendo divisions outside Japan elects to localize any of these games to their regions.

A sequel to Custom Robo GX was originally planned for release on the Game Boy Advance, but the project was discontinued. It was planned for release in late 2005 in Japan.

References

Notes

External links
Official Nintendo of America website (redirects to Nintendo.com)
Custom Robo Series at NinDB

 
1999 video games
Noise (company) games
Video game franchises
Nintendo franchises
Video game franchises introduced in 1999